Vesna Goldsworthy (née Bjelogrlić) is a Serbian writer and poet. She is from Belgrade and obtained her BA in Comparative Literature and Literary Theory from Belgrade University in 1985. She has lived in England since 1986.

Currently on the staff of Exeter University, she previously worked at Kingston University where she was Director of the Centre for Suburban Studies, and the University of East Anglia.

Her books include Inventing Ruritania (1998), the memoir Chernobyl Strawberries (2005), and a collection of poems The Angel of Salonika (2011).  Her first novel Gorsky, which updated the story of The Great Gatsby, was published in 2015. Her second novel, Monsieur Ka, which is a development of the story of Anna Karenina, was published in 2018.

Award
Goldsworthy won the Crashaw Prize in 2011.

Bibliography
 Inventing Ruritania: The Imperialism of the Imagination, Yale University Press, 1998, 
 Chernobyl Strawberries, Atlantic Books, 2005, 
 The Angel of Salonika, Salt Publishing, 2011, 
 Gorsky, The Overlook Press, 2015, 
 Monsieur Ka, Chatto and Windus, 2018,

BBC appearances
Goldsworthy formerly worked for the BBC Serbian Service as a journalist.
In 2010, she presented a BBC Radio 4 programme on finding one's voice in a foreign land.
In 2017 she was a guest on BBC Radio 3´s Private Passions.

References

External links
 The Angel of Salonika

1961 births
Academics of the University of Exeter
Serbian non-fiction writers
Serbian literary critics
Women literary critics
Serbian women poets
Serbian autobiographers
Living people
Writers from Belgrade
Serbian emigrants to the United Kingdom
Academics of Kingston University